Segra Park, formerly known as Spirit Communications Park, is a baseball park in Columbia, South Carolina. It is the home of the Columbia Fireflies, a Minor League Baseball team playing in the Carolina League. It opened in 2016 and can seat up to 9,077 people.

Background

Columbia was without minor league baseball since the Capital City Bombers relocated to Greenville, in 2004. Plans were approved to build a new stadium to attract a Minor League Baseball team in 2014, with Spirit Communications, a local telecommunications company, buying the naming rights.

Developers broke ground on Spirit Communications Park on January 6, 2015. Architectural firm Populous built the stadium, with an estimated 8,500 capacity, on a budget of $37 million, with $30 million coming from public funds, $7 million from the team. The Savannah Sand Gnats of the Class A South Atlantic League announced in May 2015 that they would move to Columbia for the 2016 season, and be known as the Columbia Fireflies. Their first game at Spirit Communications Park, on April 14, 2016, was a 4–1 victory over the Greenville Drive attended by 9,077 people.

In its first season, Ballpark Digest named Spirit Communications Park it's 2016 Ballpark of the Year. It's the first time that a stadium has received the honor in its first year since Fluor Field at the West End, home of the Greenville Drive did in 2006.

On September 7, 2018, the ballpark hosted the United Music Festival hip hop concert with Ludacris, Flo Rida, Nelly, and Ying Yang Twins.

Originally known as Spirit Communications Park, the facility was renamed Segra Park in January 2019 following the merger of Spirit Communications and Lumos Networks Corp into Segra.

References

External links
Official website

Minor league baseball venues
Baseball venues in South Carolina
Buildings and structures in Columbia, South Carolina
Tourist attractions in Columbia, South Carolina
2016 establishments in South Carolina
Sports venues completed in 2016
Populous (company) buildings
Carolina League ballparks